Rare Breed is a compilation album presented by American rapper, MC Breed. It was released February 8, 2000 for Albatross Records and was produced by MC Breed, Jazze Pha and Chuck Nyce.

Track listing
"Roll Up a Phat One" – 4:18 
"The Bomb" – 5:41 
"Playa Hatta" - 4:59 
"I Don't Give a Fuck" – 1:08 
"SWATS" – 4:21 
"What's It Gonna Be" – 4:37 
"Make Me Wanna" – 3:34 
"On a Mission" – 4:35 
"Ashes to Ashes" – 4:44 
"Put It Down" – 1:14 
"Money Make the World" – 4:14 
"First U Fuck Me" – 4:14 
"The World" – 5:36 
"It's a Must" – 6:21 
"Phat Phunk" – 4:40

References

2000 albums
MC Breed albums